The 1998 European Beach Volleyball Championships were held from August 24 to August 27, 1998, on the island of Rhodes in Greece. It was the sixth official edition of the men's event, which started in 1993, while the women competed for the fifth time.

Men's competition

Women's competition

References
 Beach Volleyball Results

1998
E
B
B